Togolese National Olympic Committee (IOC code: TOG) is the National Olympic Committee representing Togo.

External links 
IOC website

Togo
 
1963 establishments in Togo
Olympic
Sports organizations established in 1963